Robert Gordon (born July 9, 1968) is an American former professional football player who was a wide receiver for thirteen seasons in the Canadian Football League (CFL), six of those for the Winnipeg Blue Bombers. He was a CFL Eastern All Star in 1999 and 2000.  In 1998, 2001–2002 and 2005, he played in the Arena Football League for several teams.

Coaching career
Gordan was an assistant coach for the Omaha Mammoths of the Fall Experimental Football League in 2014. On May 9, 2017, Gordon was introduced as the new head coach of the Shenyang Black Rhinos of the China Arena Football League. 

Gordon was honoured in October 2018 at the annual Hall of Fame Legacy Dinner for the Winnipeg Football Club. 

Gordan was named wide receivers coach for the Montreal Alouettes of the Canadian Football League in June 2019. He coached for the Alouettes for two seasons, but was not retained following the 2021 season.

References

External links 
 Just Sports Stats
 http://www.oursportscentral.com/services/releases/?id=3024954
 
 

1968 births
Living people
Players of American football from Detroit
American football wide receivers
Nebraska–Omaha Mavericks football players
American players of Canadian football
Canadian football wide receivers
Ottawa Rough Riders players
Toronto Argonauts players
BC Lions players
Edmonton Elks players
Orlando Predators players
Winnipeg Blue Bombers players
Detroit Fury players
Los Angeles Avengers players
China Arena Football League coaches
Fall Experimental Football League coaches
Montreal Alouettes coaches